"Love Letters" is a 1945 popular song with lyrics by Edward Heyman and music by Victor Young. The song appeared, without lyrics, in the movie of the same name performed by Dick Haymes, and was nominated for the Academy Award for Best Original Song in 1945 but lost out to "It Might as Well Be Spring". The song has been covered by a number of artists, most notably by Nat King Cole (1957), Ketty Lester (1961), Elvis Presley (1966), and Alison Moyet (1987).

Ketty Lester version

In 1961, Era Records released Ketty Lester's version of "Love Letters" b/w "I'm a Fool to Want You". Lester's recording of "Love Letters", which featured Lincoln Mayorga's sparse piano arrangement and Earl Palmer on drums, reached No. 5 on the Billboard Hot 100 in early 1962.

The record also reached No. 2 on the R&B chart and No. 4 on the UK Singles Chart, selling over 1 million copies, and was awarded a gold disc by the RIAA. In 1991, it was ranked 176th in the RIAA-compiled list of Songs of the Century.

This version appeared on the soundtrack of the David Lynch film Blue Velvet (1986).

Charts

Elvis Presley versions

Elvis Presley recorded his version of "Love Letters" on May 26, 1966. Just over a week later on June 8, 1966, RCA released the song as a single b/w "Come What May" with The Jordanaires. "Love Letters" peaked at No. 19 on the Billboard Hot 100 on July 22, 1966. It was on the chart for just 7 weeks. Elvis Presley re-recorded the song in 1970 and subsequently released the new version on the album Love Letters from Elvis in 1971.

Charts

Alison Moyet version

In 1987, Alison Moyet released her own version of the song as a non-album single. It reached No. 4 in the UK and remained in the charts for twelve weeks. A music video was filmed to promote the single and featured Dawn French and Jennifer Saunders.

Speaking to The Quietus in 2013, Moyet revealed she recorded "Love Letters" as she knew it would be a hit: "Love Letters" and "Weak in the Presence of Beauty" – neither song I enjoy now – they're both my fault. I found them. That was when I was feeling smart, thinking that I knew what a hit was." She also told the BBC in 2004: "After my versions of "Love Letters" and "That Ole Devil Called Love" did well, there was definite pressure for me to become some sort of jazz diva."

Upon release, Music & Media described Moyet's version as "moody" and "sparsely-backed". Zodiac Mindwarp, as guest reviewer for Smash Hits, felt the song was "very well done" but reminiscent of Simply Red. Carole Linfield of Record Mirror criticised Moyet's rendition as "dreary" and a "slow and dopey cover".

Charts

Other versions
Dick Haymes (in 1945, US No. 11)
Sandie Shaw (in 1965)
Kei Marimura (in 1982)
Natalie Cole (in 1996)
Diana Krall (in 2001)

References

Songs about letters (message)
1945 songs
1962 singles
1966 singles
Songs with music by Victor Young
Songs with lyrics by Edward Heyman
Ketty Lester songs
Elvis Presley songs
Alison Moyet songs
Songs written for films
Song recordings produced by Bill Szymczyk
1987 singles
CBS Records singles
London Records singles
RCA Records singles